The Kansas City Southern Depot is a former Kansas City Southern Railway station located at the intersection of Spanish and Port Arthur Streets in Zwolle, Louisiana. Built in 1914, the depot is the only surviving building connected to the railroad in Zwolle. The railroad was built through the Zwolle area in 1896, and the town was founded shortly thereafter; the 1914 depot was a replacement for the town's original station. The railway station was an important shipping center for the town's lumber industry; lumber was Sabine Parish's chief export from the early 1900s through the 1940s, and the railroad made Zwolle one of the two main milling towns in the parish.

The depot was added to the National Register of Historic Places on August 7, 1989.

References

Railway stations on the National Register of Historic Places in Louisiana
Railway stations in the United States opened in 1914
Kansas City Southern Railway stations
National Register of Historic Places in Sabine Parish, Louisiana
Former railway stations in Louisiana